Leicester Castle is in the city of the same name in the English county of Leicestershire. The complex is situated in the west of Leicester City Centre, between Saint Nicholas Circle to the north and De Montfort University to the south. A large motte and the Great Hall are the two substantial remains of what was once a large defensive structure. The hall is now encased in a Queen Anne style frontage. The Castle and the Magazine Gateway is a scheduled monument.

History

Leicester Castle was part of the medieval town defences, built over the Roman town walls. The castle was probably built around 1070 (soon after the Norman Conquest in 1066) under the governorship of Hugh de Grandmesnil. The remains now consist of a mound, along with ruins.  Originally the mound was 40 ft (12.2 m) high.

In 1173, Henry II's three eldest sons led a rebelled against him with support from several magnates, including Robert de Beaumont, 3rd Earl of Leicester. During the conflict, Henry's forces laid siege to Leicester and burnt most of the town. The castle was then slighted (partially demolished) and parts of the ditches filled. According to historian Sidney Painter, it was one of at least 21 castles demolished on Henry II's instructions.

Kings sometimes stayed at the castle (Edward I in 1300, and Edward II in 1310 and 1311), and John of Gaunt and his second wife Constance of Castile both died here in 1399 and 1394 respectively.  Henry of Grosmont, 1st Duke of Lancaster, one of the leading captains in the early phases of the Hundred Years' War died at the castle on 23 March 1361.

It became an official royal residence during the reigns of Henry IV, Henry V, Henry VI and Edward IV, but by the middle of the 15th century, it was no longer considered suitable and was used mainly as a courthouse; with sessions being held in the Great Hall. Apart from being used for assize courts, the Great Hall was also used for sessions of the Parliament of England most notably the Parliament of Bats in 1426, when the conditions in London were not suitable.

A section of the castle wall, adjacent to the Turret Gateway, has gun loops (holes) that were poked through the medieval wall to use as firing ports by the city's residents when Parliamentarian Leicester was besieged, captured, and ransacked, during the English Civil War by the main Royalist Field army under Charles I and Prince Rupert on 31 May 1645. The third storey of the Turret Gateway (known as 'Prince Rupert's gateway') was destroyed in an election riot in 1832.

In the 1880s, J. M. Barrie visited the assize courts regularly and spent many hours inside as reporter for the Nottingham Journal when the hall was being used as a court house. The castle continued to be used as the venue for assizes and quarter sessions and, after 1972, for hearings of Leicester Crown Court until the Leicester Law Courts in Wellington Street were completed in 1981.

See also
Castles in Great Britain and Ireland
List of castles in England
List of museums in Leicestershire
Jewry Wall Museum
Leicester Museum & Art Gallery
Abbey Pumping Station
Leicester Guildhall

References

External links

Photographs of the area around the castle
Bibliography of sources relating to  Leicester Castle

Leicester
History of Leicester
Castles in Leicestershire
Grade I listed buildings in Leicestershire
Tourist attractions in Leicestershire
Grade I listed castles
Buildings and structures in Leicester
Ruins in Leicestershire
Scheduled monuments in Leicester